Pisces  is a constellation of the zodiac. Its vast bulk – and main asterism viewed in most European cultures per Greco-Roman antiquity as a distant pair of fishes connected by one cord each that join at an apex – are in the Northern celestial hemisphere. Its name is Latin for "fishes". It is between Aquarius, of similar size, to the southwest and Aries, which is smaller, to the east. The ecliptic and the celestial equator intersect within this constellation and in Virgo. This means the sun passes directly overhead of the equator, on average, at approximately this point in the sky, at the March equinox.

Features 

The March equinox is currently located in Pisces, due south of ω Psc, and, due to precession, slowly drifting due west, just below the western fish towards Aquarius.

Stars 

There are only two stars brighter than magnitude 4 in Pisces. It is also the dimmest of the zodiac constellations.

 Alrescha ("the cord"), otherwise Alpha Piscium (α Psc), 309.8 lightyears, class A2, magnitude 3.62. Variable binary star.
 Fumalsamakah ("mouth of the fish"), otherwise Beta Piscium (β Psc), 492 lightyears, class B6Ve, magnitude 4.48
 Delta Piscium (δ Psc), 305 lightyears, class K5III, magnitude 4.44. Like other stars near the ecliptic, Delta Piscium is subject to lunar occultations.
 Epsilon Piscium (ε Psc), 190 lightyears, class K0III, magnitude 4.27. Has a candidate exoplanet.
 Revati ("rich"), otherwise Zeta Piscium (ζ Psc), 148 lightyears, class A7IV, magnitude 5.21. Quintuple star system.
 Alpherg ("emptying"), otherwise Eta Piscium (η Psc), 349 lightyears, class G7 IIIa, magnitude 3.62. It is a Gamma Cassiopeiae variable with a weak magnetic field.
 Torcular ("thread"), otherwise Omicron Piscium (ο Psc), 258 lightyears, class K0III, magnitude 4.2. It is an evolved red giant star on the horizontal branch.
 Omega Piscium (ω Psc), 106 lightyears, class F4IV, magnitude 4.03. It is an F-type star that is either a subgiant or on the main sequence.
 Gamma Piscium (γ Psc), 138 lightyears, magnitude 3.70. The star hosts an exoplanet which was discovered in 2021. It has a spectral type of G8 III.
 Van Maanen's Star is the closest-known solitary white dwarf to us, with a dim apparent magnitude. It is located about 2° to the south of the star Delta Piscium, with a relatively high proper motion of 2.978″ annually along a position angle of 155.538°. It is closer to the Sun than any other solitary white dwarf. It is too faint to be seen with the naked eye. Like other white dwarfs, it is a very dense star: its mass has been estimated to be about 67% of the Sun's, yet it has only 1% of the Sun's radius. The outer atmosphere has a temperature of approximately 6,110 K, which is relatively cool for a white dwarf. As all white dwarfs steadily radiate away their heat over time, this temperature can be used to estimate its age, thought to be around 3 billion years. It was originally thought to be an F-type star before the properties of white dwarfs were known.

Due to the dimness of these stars, the constellation is essentially invisible in or near any major city due to light pollution.

Deep-sky objects 

M74 is a loosely wound (type Sc) spiral galaxy in Pisces, found at a distance of 30 million light years (redshift 0.0022). It has many clusters of young stars and the associated nebulae, showing extensive regions of star formation. It was discovered by Pierre Méchain, a French astronomer, in 1780. A type II-P supernova was discovered in the outer regions of M74 by Robert Evans in June 2003; the star that underwent the supernova was later identified as a red supergiant with a mass of 8 solar masses. It is the brightest member of the M74 Group.

NGC 488 is an isolated face-on prototypical spiral galaxy. Two supernovae have been observed in the galaxy.

NGC 520 is a pair of colliding galaxies located 105 million light-years away.

CL 0024+1654 is a massive galaxy cluster that lenses the galaxy behind it, creating arc-shaped images of the background galaxy. The cluster is primarily made up of yellow elliptical and spiral galaxies, at a distance of 3.6 billion light-years from Earth (redshift 0.4), half as far away as the background galaxy, which is at a distance of 5.7 billion light-years (redshift 1.67).

History and mythology 

Pisces originates from some composition of the Babylonian constellations Šinunutu4 "the great swallow" in current western Pisces, and Anunitum the "Lady of the Heaven" (supposedly Inanna), at the place of the northern fish. In the first-millennium BC texts known as the Astronomical Diaries, part of the constellation was also called DU.NU.NU (Rikis-nu.mi, "the fish cord or ribbon").

Greco-Roman period 
Pisces is associated with the Greek legend that Aphrodite and her son Eros either shape-shifted into forms of fishes to escape, or were rescued by two fishes.

In the Greek version according to Hyginus, Aphrodite and Eros while visiting Syria fled from the monster Typhon by leaping into the Euphrates River and transforming into fishes (Poeticon astronomicon 2.30, citing Diognetus Erythraeus). The Roman variant of the story has Venus and Cupid (counterparts for Aphrodite and Eros) carried away from this danger on the backs of two fishes (Ovid Fasti 2.457ff).

There is also a different origin tale that Hyginus preserved in another work. According to this, an egg rolled into the Euphrates, and some fishes nudged this to shore, after which the doves sat on the egg until Aphrodite (thereafter called the Syrian Goddess) hatched out of it. The fishes were then rewarded by being placed in the skies as a constellation (Fabulae 197). This story is also recorded by the Third Vatican Mythographer.

Modern period 

In 1690, the astronomer Johannes Hevelius in his Firmamentum Sobiescianum regarded the constellation Pisces as being composed of four subdivisions:
 Piscis Boreus (the North Fish): σ – 68 – 65 – 67 – ψ1 – ψ2 – ψ3 – χ – φ – υ – 91 – τ – 82 – 78 Psc.
 Linum Boreum (the North Cord): χ – ρ,94 – VX(97) – η – π – ο – α Psc.
 Linum Austrinum (the South Cord): α – ξ – ν – μ – ζ – ε – δ – 41 – 35 – ω Psc.
 Piscis Austrinus (the South Fish): ω – ι – θ – 7 – β – 5 – κ,9 – λ – TX(19) Psc.

"Piscis Austrinus" more often refers to a separate constellation in its own right. 

In 1754, the botanist and author John Hill proposed to sever a southern zone of Pisces as Testudo (the Turtle). 24 – 27 – YY(30) – 33 – 29 Psc., It would host a natural but quite faint asterism in which the star 20 Psc is the head of the turtle. While Admiral Smyth mentioned the proposal, it was largely neglected by other astronomers, and it is now obsolete.

Western folklore
The Fishes are in the German lore of Antenteh, who owned just a tub and a crude cabin when he met two magical fish. They offered him a wish, which he refused. However, his wife begged him to return to the fish and ask for a beautifully furnished home. This wish was granted, but her desires were not satisfied. She then asked to be a queen and have a palace, but when she asked to become a goddess, the fish became angry and took the palace and home, leaving the couple with the tub and cabin once again. The tub is sometimes recognized as the Great Square of Pegasus.

In non-Western astronomy 
The stars of Pisces were incorporated into several constellations in Chinese astronomy. Wai-ping ("Outer Enclosure") was a fence that kept a pig farmer from falling into the marshes and kept the pigs where they belonged. It was represented by Alpha, Delta, Epsilon, Zeta, Mu, Nu, and Xi Piscium. The marshes were represented by the four stars designated Phi Ceti. The northern fish of Pisces was a part of the House of the Sandal, Koui-siou.

Astrology 

Pisces is a dim zodiac constellation between Aquarius and Aries. While astrological sign, water sign Pisces is deemed to fix on ecliptical longitudes 330° to 0, when the sun figures at these it is now mostly in Aquarius, due to the precession from when the constellation and the sign coincided.  Precession results in Western astrology's zodiacal divisions, thus, not corresponding in the current era to the constellations that carry alike names while Jyotiṣa, widely used in Hindu and Jain culture, will assign events to the Sun's current background constellations.

See also
List of star names in Pisces
Pisces (Chinese astronomy)

References

Sources
 
 
 
 Richard Hinckley Allen, Star Names, Their Lore and Legend, New York, Dover: various dates.
 
 Thomas Wm. Hamilton, Useful Star Names, Strategic Books, 2008.

External links 

 The Deep Photographic Guide to the Constellations: Pisces
 Star Tales – Pisces
 Warburg Institute Iconographic Database (medieval and early modern images of Pisces)

 
Constellations
Equatorial constellations
Constellations listed by Ptolemy